WKSQ (94.5 MHz "Kiss-FM") is a commercial FM radio station licensed to Ellsworth, Maine, and serving the Bangor metropolitan area.  The station broadcasts an adult contemporary radio format, switching to Christmas music for part of November and December.  It is owned by Blueberry Broadcasting.  Programming is simulcast in the Skowhegan area on WQSK (97.5 FM) in Madison, which was formerly part of Fox Sports Maine.  And in the Mid Coast area, WKSQ is simulcast on WQSS (102.5 FM) in Camden, which formerly offered its own adult contemporary format.

WKSQ carries Maine Black Bears football and men's hockey, sharing flagship status of the Black Bear Sports Network with WAEI.  In morning drive time, WKSQ carries The Bob and Sheri Show syndicated from WKQC-FM Charlotte.  It had carried Intelligence for Your Life with John Tesh in the evening, until 2019.

Former logo

References

External links

KSQ
Mainstream adult contemporary radio stations in the United States
Ellsworth, Maine
Radio stations established in 1982
Blueberry Broadcasting radio stations
1982 establishments in Maine